Eldorbek Suyunov (Uzbek Cyrillic: Элдорбек Суюнов; born 12 April 1991 in Qarshi, Uzbekistan) is an Uzbekistani footballer who plays for FC Pakhtakor Tashkent and Uzbekistan national football team.

Career
He was a player of Nasaf's youth academy and in 2008 he started to play for Nasaf's youth team. In 2011 he began to play for the first team. Since 2012 he has established himself Nasaf's number one goalkeeper. He played at the 2015 AFC Asian Cup qualification.

Honours

Club
Nasaf
Uzbek League runners-up (1): 2011
Uzbek Cup runners-up (3): 2011, 2012, 2013
AFC Cup (1): 2011

References

External links

1991 births
Living people
Uzbekistani footballers
Uzbekistan international footballers
FC Nasaf players
People from Qashqadaryo Region
Association football goalkeepers
2015 AFC Asian Cup players
Footballers at the 2014 Asian Games
Asian Games competitors for Uzbekistan